Urban Saints is a Christian youth charity based in the United Kingdom. Previously known as Crusaders, it has been operating since the early 1900s. Urban Saints is a member of the Evangelical Alliance.

History

The original Crusaders group was formed in 1900 in north London by Rev Albert Kestin, with the intention of teaching the Bible to young people who did not attend church. Several similar groups started in the years that following and in 1906, under the leadership of Herbert Bevington, the leaders of eleven groups voted to form the Crusaders’ Union as an umbrella organisation. By 1939 there were 256 groups.

In 2006, the organisation became known as Urban Saints. The name was revealed at a concert at the Royal Albert Hall to celebrate the centenary of the Crusaders’ Union.

In 2000, Matt Summerfield became chief executive. Since then, the organisation has developed Energize, online resources, discipleship activities, discussions and videos for youth and children’s groups. As of 2018, Energize had over 1600 subscribers.

Urban Saints also offers summer camps, overseas adventure trips and additional needs training. Urban Saints own Urban Saints Westbrook, a residential centre and campsite on the Isle of Wight. This site has been in operation since 1948.

In 2017, following the arrival of Richard Langmead as chief executive, the organisation's strategy placed focus on planting and supporting new groups in churches, schools and communities across the UK and Ireland.

References

External links 
Urban Saints website

Religious organisations based in England
Charities based in the United Kingdom
Christian organizations established in 1900
Christian organizations established in 1906
Christianity in England
Christian organizations established in the 20th century
Christian youth organizations
Evangelical parachurch organizations
1906 establishments in the United Kingdom